Siliva Havili (born 18 February 1993) is a professional rugby league footballer who plays as a  and  for the South Sydney Rabbitohs in the National Rugby League (NRL). He has played for both Tonga and New Zealand at international level.

He previously played for the New Zealand Warriors, the St. George Illawarra Dragons and the Canberra Raiders in the National Rugby League.

Background
Havili was born in Auckland, New Zealand. He was educated at St Paul's College, Auckland.

Playing career

Early career
An Otara Scorpions junior, Havili signed with the New Zealand Warriors and has played in their NYC side in the 2011, 2012 and 2013 seasons. Havili has also played for the Auckland Vulcans in the NSW Cup. Havili was a Junior Kiwi in 2011 and 2012.

2013
On 20 April 2013, Havili made his international debut for Tonga against Samoa in the Pacific Rugby League International at Penrith Stadium. Havili started at hooker in the Tongan 36–4 victory.
On 8 October 2013, Havili was selected in the Tonga 24 man squad. 

Havili played 1 match for Tonga in the 2013 Rugby League World Cup in Tonga's opening match against Scotland, playing at hooker in Tonga's 26–24 loss at Derwent Park.

2014
Havili made his first grade debut in Round 6 of the 2014 NRL season against the Canterbury-Bankstown Bulldogs playing off the bench in the Warriors 21–20 loss at Eden Park. On 28 April 2014, after just playing in 3 NRL matches, Havili earnt a surprise call-up to the Kiwis squad to take on Australia in the 2014 Anzac Test at SFS. Havili his New Zealand international debut off the bench in the 30–18 loss. On 11 May 2014, Havili extended his contract with the Warriors for a further two seasons, keeping him at the club to the end off the 2016 season. Havili finished off his debut year in the NRL with him playing in 6 matches for the Warriors in the 2014 season. On 9 September 2014, Havili was selected for the New Zealand 2014 Four Nations train on squad.  On 7 October 2014, Havili was selected in the New Zealand national rugby league team final 24 man squad for the series.

2015
On 20 July 2015, Havili signed a two-year contract with the St. George Illawarra Dragons starting in 2016.

2016
Havili played ten games for the Dragons, all coming from the bench.  On 24 July, Havili and Tim Lafai were arrested after brawling in the street outside a nightclub with another man. The alleged victim claimed Havili punched him when he had his back turned. Lafai and Havili were charged with common assault and offensive behaviour, but later escaped conviction with a guilty plea.

2017
Havili was selected to play for Tonga in the 2017 Rugby League World Cup despite not playing a single game for the Dragons that season. After producing a string of excellent performances in the World Cup, he was signed to a one-year contract by the Canberra Raiders.

2018

With first-choice hooker Josh Hodgson injured for much of season 2018, Havili produced the best season of his career to date, playing 24 games and earning himself a two-year contract extension. 

He also retained his place in the Tonga squad for their historic first Test match against the Australian Kangaroos on October 20.

2019
Havili made 22 appearances for Canberra in the 2019 NRL season as the club reached their first grand final in 25 years. Havili did not play in the 2019 NRL Grand Final in which Canberra were defeated 14–8 by the Sydney Roosters at ANZ Stadium.

2020
He played 23 games for Canberra in the 2020 NRL season including the club's preliminary final loss against Melbourne.

2021
He was limited to only eleven appearances for Canberra in the 2021 NRL season which saw the club miss the finals series.
On 21 October, he signed a two-year deal to join South Sydney.

2022
Havili played 23 games for South Sydney in the 2022 NRL season including two of the clubs finals matches against the Sydney Roosters and Cronulla. Havili did not feature in South Sydney's preliminary final loss to eventual premiers Penrith.

In October 2022 he was named in the Tonga squad for the 2021 Rugby League World Cup.

References

External links

South Sydney Rabbitohs profile
Canberra Raiders profile
NRL profile
St. George Illawarra Dragons profile
2017 RLWC profile

1993 births
Living people
New Zealand rugby league players
New Zealand sportspeople of Tongan descent
Tonga national rugby league team players
New Zealand national rugby league team players
New Zealand Warriors players
Canberra Raiders players
St. George Illawarra Dragons players
South Sydney Rabbitohs players
Auckland rugby league team players
Rugby league players from Auckland
Junior Kiwis players
Manurewa Marlins players
Rugby league hookers
People educated at St Paul's College, Auckland